Falcon Dam Port of Entry is a port of entry to the United States on the Mexican border.

The Falcon Dam was built in 1954 to mitigate the effects of flooding conditions that had long plagued the towns and cities on the Texas-Mexico border, and to provide hydro-electric power for the Rio Grande Valley.  The Falcon Dam Port of Entry is essentially a replacement for the former Zapata Port of Entry, which was situated at a bridge in the town of Zapata, Texas.  When the dam was completed, the town was moved to higher ground, and the Zapata Bridge now lies at the bottom of Falcon Lake.

References

See also

 List of Mexico–United States border crossings
 List of Canada–United States border crossings

Mexico–United States border crossings
1954 establishments in Texas
Buildings and structures in Starr County, Texas
Buildings and structures completed in 1954